Lao-Lao is a Laotian rice whisky produced in Laos. Along with Beerlao, lao-Lao is a staple drink in Laos.

Etymology

The name lao-Lao is not the same word repeated twice, but two different words pronounced with different tones: the first, ເຫລົ້າ, means "alcohol" and is pronounced with a low-falling tone in the standard dialect, while the second, ລາວ, means Laotian ("Lao") and is pronounced with a high(-rising) tone.

Taste
Quality, taste and alcohol concentration vary by source of the drink. However, all variations are strong. Lao satoe, the white liquid by-product from lao-Lao production, is also drunk and it has a very yeasty and sweet taste.

Production and consumption

Although lao-Lao is traditionally drunk neat, a cocktail that is rising in popularity is the "Pygmy Slow Lorange", named after the pygmy slow loris, a species endemic to Laos. Various flavoured lao-Laos are made by macerating such additives as honey or scorpions. It is women who often distill lao-Lao and sell it as a source of income locally, often being their second major income. Lao-Lao sold on retail is usually clear, but amber colored varieties exist too.

It is traditional to serve two glasses of lao-Lao on ceremonies, feasts and other comparable situations. The drink is customarily expected to be drunk with a single gulp.

A less powerful version of lao-Lao, called lao-hai, and is drunk from large communal earthenware pots (hai) through long bamboo straws.

See also

 Sra peang, a similar form of wine drunk in Cambodia
 Rượu cần, a similar form of wine drunk in Vietnam
 Rice wine
 Rice baijiu
 Sato (rice wine) – Isan version

References

External links 
 Lao-Lao Rice Whisky 
 Recipe for Lao-Lao
 Description of meal with Lao-Lao

Lao cuisine
Laotian drinks
Distilled drinks